Alexander Volchkov (born January 11, 1952, in Moscow, Russia) is a retired professional ice hockey player who played in the Soviet Hockey League.  He played for HC CSKA Moscow.  He also played for the Soviet team during the 1972 Summit Series against Canada.

References

1952 births
Soviet ice hockey players
Ice hockey people from Moscow
HC CSKA Moscow players
Living people